Derek A. Roff  is a professor emeritus of evolutionary ecology at McGill University, currently associated with the University of California at Riverside. His research focuses include population genetics, quantitative genetics, and life history evolution.

He is an elected Fellow of the Royal Society of Canada and of the American Association for the Advancement of Science.

References 

1949 births
Living people
Evolutionary biologists
Fellows of the Royal Society of Canada
Fellows of the American Academy of Arts and Sciences